Harlem Nights is a 1989 American crime comedy-drama film starring and directed by Eddie Murphy, who also wrote. The film co-stars Richard Pryor, Michael Lerner, Danny Aiello, Redd Foxx (in his last film appearance before his death in 1991), Della Reese, and Murphy's older brother Charlie. The film was released theatrically on November 17, 1989, by Paramount Pictures. The film tells the story of "Sugar" Ray and Vernest "Quick" Brown as a team running a nightclub in the late 1930s in Harlem while contending with gangsters and corrupt police officials.

Harlem Nights was Eddie Murphy's only directorial effort. He had always wanted to direct and star in a period piece, as well as work with Pryor, whom he considered his greatest influence in stand-up comedy. Reviews of the film were panned. Nonetheless, the film was a financial success, grossing $95 million against a $30 million budget. It has since been regarded as a cult classic.

Plot
In 1918 Harlem, small-time hustler Sugar Ray is running a craps game. Nearly killed by an angry gambler who threatens him with a switchblade, Ray is saved by seven-year-old errand boy Vernest Brown, who shoots the man with Ray's gun. After being told that his parents are dead, Ray decides to raise the boy as his own, naming him "Quick" on account of his savvy. Twenty years later, Ray and Quick, now wealthy club owners, run a nightclub called "Club Sugar Ray", with gambling and dancing in the front, and a brothel in the back that's run by Ray's old friend Madame Vera.

Tommy Smalls, a black enforcer working for white gangster Bugsy Calhoune, and Miss Dominique LaRue, Calhoune's mistress, arrive to assess the club's profitability. Later, Calhoune sends corrupt policeman Sgt. Phil Cantone to threaten Ray with having the club shut down unless Calhoune gets a cut. Ray decides to relocate rather than pay, but only after making sure his friends and workers are taken care of. An upcoming fight between boxer Michael Kirkpatrick and defending champion (and loyal Club Sugar Ray patron) Jack Jenkins is expected to bring in large sums of money in bets. Ray places a large bet on Kirkpatrick to make Calhoune think he paid Jenkins to throw the fight. Secretly, Ray instructs his men to intercept the bets Calhoune's friends and associates have bet on the match and steal them. A sexy call girl named Sunshine is used to distract Calhoune's bag man, Richie Vinto, ensuring the theft is carried out successfully.

Calhoune has Tommy Smalls killed for theft before Quick is noticed near the scene by Tommy's brother, Reggie, who takes two men and corners him in an empty storefront. Quick shoots his attackers dead in self-defense and flees. Calhoune sends LaRue to seduce and kill Quick, but Quick anticipates this and kills LaRue with a gun hidden under his pillow.

Calhoune has Club Sugar Ray burned down. In retaliation, Sunshine goes to Richie and asks him to help her with a pickup. Richie agrees to meet her on the way to collect some money for Calhoune, only to get in a car accident orchestrated by Ray's henchman Jimmy. Ray and Quick, claiming to be law officers, attempt to arrest Richie, telling him that the woman he is riding around with is a drug dealer. Quick manages to switch the bag holding Calhoune's money with the one Sunshine had placed in the car before two white policemen suddenly arrive to investigate the accident. Richie explains that he is on a run for Bugsy Calhoune, so they let him go.

The championship fight begins. With Calhoune's gang distracted, two of Ray's men seize the opportunity to blow up his "Pitty Pat Club". At the fight, Calhoune realizes it was not fixed as he thought, and then receives word that his Pitty Pat Club has been destroyed. Quick and Ray arrive at a closed bank with Cantone following them. It turns out to be a trap, and Ray's crew seal Cantone inside a bank vault, but promise to call the police precinct to let him out when they have made their clean getaway.

Richie arrives to deliver Calhoune's money from earlier, but realizes that his bag has been switched with the one holding Sunshine's "heroin", which turns out to be sugar. An enraged Calhoune realizes that Ray is behind all of his recent setbacks. Vera, seemingly afraid for her safety, visits Calhoune and tells him where to find Ray and Quick. Calhoune and his remaining men go to Ray's hideout, where they trigger hidden explosives that kill all of them. Ray and Quick pay off the two white policemen from the accident and take one last look at Harlem, knowing they can never return and that there will never be another city like it. Despite this, the two, along with their associates Bennie and Vera, leave for an unknown location as the credits roll.

Cast
 Eddie Murphy as Vernest "Quick" Brown, Sugar Ray's adopted son who helps him run his club.
 Desi Arnez Hines II as Young Vernest "Quick" Brown
 Richard Pryor as "Sugar" Ray, a candy store owner who also operates an illegal after-hours nightclub.
 Redd Foxx as Bennie "Snake Eyes" Wilson, a nearly-blind craps dealer.
 Danny Aiello as Sergeant Phil Cantone, a crooked cop who works for Bugsy Calhoun.
 Michael Lerner as "Bugsy" Calhoun, the crime boss who owns most of the after-hours clubs in Harlem.
 Della Reese as Vera Walker, the madam at Ray's club.
 Stan Shaw as Jack Jenkins, the current heavyweight boxing champion.
 Jasmine Guy as Dominique La Rue, Bugsy Calhoun's mistress.
 Arsenio Hall as Reggie, Tommy Smalls' brother.
 Berlinda Tolbert as Annie, Sugar Ray's wife.
 Vic Polizos as Richie Vento, the bag man who makes cash pickups for Bugsy Calhoun.
 Lela Rochon as "Sunshine", a prostitute who works at Ray's club.
 David Marciano as Tony, one of Bugsy Calhoun's goons.
 Thomas Mikal Ford as Tommy Smalls, the manager of one of Bugsy Calhoun's clubs.
 Miguel A. Núñez Jr. as Man With Broken Nose 
 Charlie Murphy as Jimmy
 Robin Harris as Romeo

Production
The part of Dominique La Rue, played by Jasmine Guy, was originally cast with actress Michael Michele. Michele was fired during production because, according to Murphy, she "wasn't working out". Michele sued Murphy, saying that in reality she was fired for rejecting Murphy's romantic advances. Murphy denied the charge, saying that he had never even had a private conversation with her. The lawsuit was settled out of court for an undisclosed sum.

"It's turning out to be more pleasant than I expected," Pryor told Rolling Stone. "[Murphy is] wise enough to listen to people. I seen him be very patient with his actors. It's not a lark to him. He's really serious." "He's on top of the world and he's doing a hell of a job," agreed Foxx. "He sure knows how to handle people with sensitivity. He'll come over to your side and give private direction—he never embarrasses anyone." "You walk around here and look at the people," added Pryor. "Have you ever in your life seen this many black people on a movie set? I haven't."

About the movie's reception, Murphy said: "It wasn't a pleasurable experience. I just wanted to direct—just to see if I can do it. And I found out that I can't, and I won't do it anymore. And the biggest thing is I didn't enjoy doing it. The problem with Harlem Nights wasn't the directing as much as it was the writing of it. It was just written fucked up, and that's because I threw it together real quick. And then it was disappointing because Richard wasn't the way I thought Richard was gonna be. I thought it would be like a collaborative thing where I would get to work with my idol, and then it would be like, "This is great." But Richard would come to the set, say his line and leave, it wasn't like a collaborative thing."

Later he said: "That movie was a blur. It was Richard [Pryor], Robin Harris—all comedians. I remember Richard and Redd Foxx laughing offstage during the whole movie. The funniest shit was off camera, we're all just crying. Redd was a really funny dude, he would have the set screaming all the time. But afterwards it was like, Whoa, that's a lot of work. I was really young when I did it. I had one foot in the club, and one foot on the set, a lot of shit going on. It's amazing it came together." He also said he didn't know Pryor was sick at the time. "He was sick with MS by then, but nobody knew it was going on. And I was like a puppy to him 'cause he was my idol. "Hey! Let's go make this movie!" I never put it together what was happening till afterwards. So it was kind of sad, that part of it."

Release

Box office
Opening in North America in mid-November 1989, the film debuted at No.1 its opening weekend. It grossed $16,096,808 from 2,180 screens during those first three days setting a record pre-holiday fall opening and would go on to collect a total of $60,864,870 domestically at the box office. Despite a fair gross, the film was considered a box office disappointment by the studio, earning roughly half of Murphy's earlier box office successes Coming to America and Beverly Hills Cop II from the previous two years.

Critical response
On review aggregator Rotten Tomatoes, the film holds an approval rating of 27% based 37 reviews, with an average score of 4/10. The website's critical consensus reads, "An all-star comedy lineup is wasted on a paper-thin plot and painfully clunky dialogue." On Metacritic, the film received a score of 16 based on 14 reviews, indicating "overwhelming dislike".
Michael Wilmington noted in the Los Angeles Times that the "production design lacks glitter. The movie also lacks the Harlem outside the gaudy gangland environs, the poverty, filth, pain, humanity, humor and danger that feeds these mobster fantasies."

Both Gene Siskel and Roger Ebert panned the film; it was featured on their "Worst of 1989" review show with Siskel stating that it was racist, sexist, and badly directed, and Ebert agreeing with him, also adding that they thought Murphy was directing a film to call himself a director.

Movie theater shooting controversy
On November 17, 1989, two men were shot in the parking lot outside of the AMC Americana 8 theater in the Detroit suburb of Southfield, Michigan. According to witnesses quoted in the Detroit Free Press, the shooting happened on opening night taking place during a shooting spree in the film's opening. A 22-year-old woman, who panicked and ran into traffic, was in critical condition two days later at the city's Providence Hospital; her name was withheld by police. Less than an hour after the shooting, police arrived at the theater to find a 24-year-old Detroit man who had shot at an officer. The gunman was wounded when the officer shot him back in the theater parking lot. The incident caused the theater chain to cancel showings of Harlem Nights. One resident of the area, D'Shanna Watson, said:

Later that night, brawlers were ejected from a Sacramento theater showing Harlem Nights. Their feud continued in a parking lot and ended with gunshots. Two 24-year-old men were seriously injured. An hour later, Marcel Thompson, 17, was fatally shot in a similar fight at a theater in Richmond, California. When police stopped the projection of Harlem Nights to find suspects, an hour-long riot erupted. In Boston, Mayor Raymond Flynn saw so many fistfights taking place in a crowd leaving Harlem Nights that he at first threatened to close the theater down but decided to tighten police security at the theater. Flynn blamed the film for the riot, stating that it "glorifies violence." However, Raymond Howard, a lieutenant of the Richmond police department, defended the film, saying, "There's nothing wrong with the show. But this tells me something about the nature of kids who are going to see these shows."

Accolades
 Stinkers Bad Movie Awards:
 Worst Picture
 Golden Raspberry Award:
 Worst Screenplay (Eddie Murphy)

Nominated
 Academy Awards:
 Academy Award for Best Costume Design (Joe I. Tompkins)
 Golden Raspberry Award
 Worst Director (Eddie Murphy)

References

External links

 
 
 

 

1989 films
1989 directorial debut films
1980s buddy comedy-drama films
1980s buddy cop films
1980s crime comedy-drama films
1980s heist films
1980s police comedy films
1980s police procedural films
African-American comedy-drama films
American buddy comedy-drama films
American buddy cop films
American crime comedy-drama films
American heist films
American police detective films
1980s English-language films
Films about African-American organized crime
Films about organized crime in the United States
Films directed by Eddie Murphy
Films scored by Herbie Hancock
Films set in Harlem
Films set in Manhattan
Films set in New York City
Films set in the 1910s
Films set in 1918
Films set in the 1930s
Films set in 1938
Films with screenplays by Eddie Murphy
Mass shootings in the United States
Paramount Pictures films
1980s American films